Robert Lyle Stoddard (born March 8, 1957) is an American former professional baseball pitcher who played for the Seattle Mariners, Detroit Tigers, San Diego Padres and Kansas City Royals of Major League Baseball (MLB). Stoddard attended Fresno State University and he threw and batted right-handed.

Stoddard, who was 6'1" and 200 (some sources say he was 190 or 210) pounds, was drafted four times. He was drafted in the 19th round of the 1975 MLB draft by the Milwaukee Brewers, in the 3rd round of the 1976 MLB draft by the Oakland Athletics. In 1976, he was drafted by the Atlanta Braves in the third round too, this time in a different draft (there are multiple drafts held each year). He was not drafted at all in 1977, and in 1978-when he was drafted by the Seattle Mariners in the 10th round-he finally decided to sign.

Stoddard had spent less than four seasons in the minor leagues when he made his MLB debut on September 4, 1981, at the age of 24. He experienced two successful seasons in 1981 and 1982, posting ERAs of 2.60 and 2.41 in each of those two seasons, respectively. In 1983, his statistics went "downhill"-his win–loss record was a mediocre 9-17. After that season, his ERA reached under 3.00 only once more. His final MLB game was September 19, 1987.

References

External links

Venezuelan Professional Baseball League
Stods Batting and Pitching Cages & Lessons

1957 births
Living people
American expatriate baseball players in Canada
Baseball players from San Jose, California
Calgary Cannons players
Denver Zephyrs players
Detroit Tigers players
Fresno State Bulldogs baseball players
Gavilan Rams baseball players
Kansas City Royals players
Las Vegas Stars (baseball) players
Leones del Caracas players
American expatriate baseball players in Venezuela
Major League Baseball pitchers
Nashville Sounds players
Norfolk Tides players
Omaha Royals players
Salt Lake City Gulls players
San Diego Padres players
San Jose Missions players
Seattle Mariners players
Spokane Indians players
Stockton Mariners players
Tacoma Tigers players